The president of Galmudug is the head of state and head of government of Galmudug, a federated state of the Federal Republic of Somalia. The president and vice president are elected for a four-year term, and can serve two consecutive terms.

List

See also
List of presidents of Somaliland
List of presidents of Puntland
List of presidents of Somalia

References

External links
World Statesmen – Somalia (Galmudug)

Galmudug
Somalia history-related lists
Government of Somalia